The USSR International in badminton was an international open held in the Union of Soviet Socialist Republics since 1973, and finished in 1992 with the dissolution of the Soviet Union and the establishment of the Commonwealth of Independent States (CIS), in its place.

The Russian International is the continuation of this tournament.

Winners

External links
http://www.badmintoneurope.com/file_download.aspx?id=4463

Badminton tournaments
Badminton in the Soviet Union
International sports competitions hosted by the Soviet Union
1973 establishments in the Soviet Union
1992 disestablishments in Russia
Recurring sporting events established in 1973
Recurring sporting events disestablished in 1992